is a railway station located in the town of Yuza, Yamagata Prefecture, Japan, operated by the East Japan Railway Company (JR East).

Lines
Yuza Station is served by the Uetsu Main Line, and is located 179.1 rail kilometers from the terminus of the line at Niitsu Station.

Station layout
The station has one side platform and one island platform connected by a footbridge. The station is staffed.

Platforms

History
Yuza Station opened on December 5, 1919, as a station on the Japanese Government Railways (JGR). The JGR became the JNR (Japan National Railway) after World War II. With the privatization of the JNR on April 1, 1987, the station came under the control of the East Japan Railway Company. A new station building was completed on March 1, 2008.

Passenger statistics
In fiscal 2018, the station was used by an average of 169 passengers daily (boarding passengers only).

Surrounding area
Yuza Town Hall
Yuza High School

See also
List of railway stations in Japan

References

External links

 JR East Station information 

Railway stations in Japan opened in 1919
Railway stations in Yamagata Prefecture
Uetsu Main Line
Yuza, Yamagata